Thierry Siquet (born 18 October 1968 in Huy) is a Belgian retired professional football defender, who is the manager of Belgium U18 and the technical director of Virton.

While at La Louvière he helped them win the 2002–03 Belgian Cup.

Charleroi 
After retiring as a player in January 2006, Siquet stayed at Royal Charleroi, where he was hired as an assistant manager to Jacky Mathijssen for the season 2006-2007 and later to Philippe Vande Walle.

After Vande Walle resigned in December 2007, Siquet was appointed manager for the next two games. Despite losing them, he was confirmed as the manager for the rest of the season. During the second half of the season, the results improved and Charleroi finished in an 8th place. Siquet was then confirmed as manager for the season 2008-2009 season also. Twelve months later, on 15 December 2008 Siquet got fired. Siquet later spoke of a lack of confidence from the club, which kept him on board after his resignation until an agreement was reached with his successor John Collins

RE Bertrix 
On 17 March 2009, Siquet was appointed manager of Belgian Fourth Division club Royale Entente Bertrigeoise (RE Bertrix). Siquet won promotion to the Belgian Third Division in his first season with the club. In the 2010/11 season, he finished third with the club in the Belgian Third Division B, but because Bertrix hadnøt applied for a license for the Belgian Second Division, they was forces to stay in the third division for another season.

After that, things didn't go as well for Siquet and Bertrix: in the 2011/12 season, the club could only narrowly avoid the final round for relegation, and in the following season ended with a relegation to the fourth division. Siquet and Bertrix then separated in April 2013.

National Team and Virton 
Siquet started working as a youth coach at the KBVB in 2012, where he coached Belgium U-15 national team until 2014. In 2014, he was promoted to manager of the U16 national team. From 2015 to 2020 he was the manager of Belgium -17.

In May 2013, Siquet also became the technical director of Virton's youth academy.

When Johan Walem became national coach of Cyprus in March 2020, Siquet was appointed manager for Belgium's U-18 national team.

References

External links
Cerclemuseum.be 
Belgian profile

1968 births
Living people
Belgian footballers
People from Huy
Association football defenders
Belgian football managers
Standard Liège players
Cercle Brugge K.S.V. players
Beerschot A.C. players
R.A.A. Louviéroise players
R. Charleroi S.C. players
R. Charleroi S.C. managers
Belgian Pro League players
Footballers from Liège Province